Ocyceros is a genus of birds in the family Bucerotidae. Established by Allan Octavian Hume in 1873, it contains several species that are limited to the Indian subcontinent.

Description
Hornbills in the genus Ocyceros are small Asian birds with curved triangular bills and grey plumage.  As such, they are often called "grey hornbills". They have black and grey eye rings and their eyes are usually dark with black irises. All of the species have different coloured bills: the Indian grey hornbill has a dark greyish bill, the Sri Lanka grey hornbill has a pale yellowish bill, and the Malabar grey hornbill has a more yellowish orange bill.

Species 
The genus contains three species:

References

 

Bird genera
Taxa named by Allan Octavian Hume